Milton is an area of Stoke-on-Trent, in the Stoke-on-Trent district, in the ceremonial county of Staffordshire, England. It is mainly situated between the A5009 and A53 roads. It shares its borders with Light Oaks, Baddeley Green, Sneyd Green, and Abbey Hulton.  

Milton is part of the Abbey Green ward.

Bagnall Road Wood, a local nature reserve, is a short distance east of the village.

History 
The name Milton derived from the Old English terms 'Mill tun' and reflects the many mills that were in operation in the 19th Century. 

In 1777, the Caldon Canal running through Milton was built and was important to the village's later development. It allowed packing houses for finished pottery to be constructed adjacent to the canal. 

From the late 19th century Milton had a number of industries. Prominent among these was Bullers Ltd who established a new factory at Milton in 1920. Bullers were manufacturers of electrical porcelain, essential to the pottery industry as a whole. There were also aluminium works, the British Aluminium Company, and chemical works, Josiah Hardman Ltd, at Milton. The Hardman Institute, which included a reading room, was established in 1895 by Josiah Hardman.

Railway
The opening of the railway from Milton to Cheddleton in 1867 (part of the North Staffordshire Railway) extended Milton's transport infrastructure and provided the village with a local station. Part of the platform of Milton railway station still remains, as do the original tracks, running adjacent to the Caldon Canal.

Civil parish 
Milton was formerly a chapelry in the parish of Norton-in-the Moors, from 31 December 1894 Milton was a civil parish in its own right, on 1 April 1922 the parish was abolished and merged with Stoke on Trent. In 1921 the parish had a population of 2748.

References

Areas of Stoke-on-Trent
Former civil parishes in Staffordshire